Bautista Pedemonte (born 14 March 2000) is an Argentine rugby union player who plays for the Jaguares. On 21 November 2019, he was named in the Jaguares squad for the 2020 Super Rugby season. His playing position is Flanker.

References

External links
 itsrugby Profile

Jaguares (Super Rugby) players
Rugby union flankers
Argentine rugby union players
2000 births
Living people
Rugby union number eights